Janez Perme (born 12 April 1982) is a retired Slovenian footballer.

Honours
Slovenian Second League: 2006–07

External links
PrvaLiga profile 

Living people
1982 births
Footballers from Ljubljana
Slovenian footballers
Association football forwards
NK Ivančna Gorica players
NK Domžale players
NK Krka players
Slovenian PrvaLiga players